Manhattan Love Song is a 1934 American pre-Code film directed by Leonard Fields.

Plot summary 

Although sisters Geraldine and Carol Stewart live luxuriously in a Park Avenue apartment in New York City, their money has run out due to some bad business investments. Their servants, Williams and Annette, expect to be leaving, but the sisters invite them to remain as paying tenants. They agree, then surprise the haughty sisters by expecting them to share in performing the household chores.

Geraldine looks for work, but receives no offers except for a striptease act in a burlesque show. Williams is mistaken for a taxi driver by a wealthy tourist, "Pancake Annie" Jones from Nevada, who has come with her son Phineas to seek an entry into Manhattan high society.

Carol elopes with a rich acquaintance, Garrett Wetherby, which leaves Geraldine on her own, needing money. She accepts the job doing a striptease, but is arrested when the club is raided. Williams decides to accept Pancake Annie's offer to go West in her employment. Geraldine realizes she loves Williams and asks to go along.

Cast 
Robert Armstrong as Tom Williams
Dixie Lee as Geraldine Stewart
Nydia Westman as Annette
Franklin Pangborn as Garrett Wetherby
Cecil Cunningham as Pancake Annie Jones
Harold Waldridge as Phineas Jones
Helen Flint as Carol Stewart
Herman Bing as Gustave
George Irving as Kenbrook
Emmett Vogan as Doctor
Harrison Greene as Joe Thomas
Eddie Dean as Sam
Nick Copeland as Al Kingston
Tom Ricketts as Rich Man
Edward Peil Sr. as Employment Agent
Hal Price as Gil, Taxicab Driver
Frances Morris as Chorus Girl

Soundtrack 
Dixie Lee - "A Little Shack on Fifth Avenue" (Music by Edward Ward and Bernie Grossman, words by David Silverstein)
"Daisy" (uncredited player) - "Hang Up Your Hat" (Music by Edward Ward and Bernie Grossman, words by David Silverstein)

1934 films
1930s romantic comedy-drama films
American black-and-white films
Films based on American novels
American romantic comedy-drama films
1934 comedy films
1934 drama films
Films scored by Edward Ward (composer)
Films directed by Leonard Fields
1930s English-language films
1930s American films